Ken Buffin (1 November 1923 – 9 December 1972) was a British gymnast. He competed at the 1948 Summer Olympics, the 1952 Summer Olympics and the 1960 Summer Olympics.

References

1923 births
1972 deaths
British male artistic gymnasts
Olympic gymnasts of Great Britain
Gymnasts at the 1948 Summer Olympics
Gymnasts at the 1952 Summer Olympics
Gymnasts at the 1960 Summer Olympics
Sportspeople from Barry, Vale of Glamorgan